The following outline is provided as an overview of and topical guide to the U.S. Commonwealth of Massachusetts:

Massachusetts – U.S. state in the New England region of the northeastern United States of America. It is bordered by Rhode Island and Connecticut to the south, New York to the west, and Vermont and New Hampshire to the north; at its east lies the Atlantic Ocean.  Approximately two-thirds of the state's population lives in Greater Boston, most of which is either urban or suburban. In the late 18th century, Boston became known as the "Cradle of Liberty" for the agitation there that led to the American Revolution and the independence of the United States from Great Britain. Massachusetts is also home to Harvard University, the oldest institution of higher learning in the U.S., founded in 1636.

General reference 

 Names
 Common name: Massachusetts
 Pronunciation: 
 Official name: Commonwealth of Massachusetts
 Abbreviations and name codes
 Postal symbol:  MA
 ISO 3166-2 code:  US-MA
 Internet second-level domain:  .ma.us
 Nicknames
Baked Bean State
 The Bay State
 Old Colony State
Pilgrim State
The Spirit of America (currently used on license plates)
 Taxachusetts (colloquial)
 Adjectival: Massachusetts
 Demonyms
 Bay Stater
 Massachusettsan
 Massachusite
 Masshole (derogatory)

Geography of Massachusetts 

Geography of Massachusetts
 Massachusetts is: a U.S. state, a federal state of the United States of America
 Location:
 Northern hemisphere
 Western hemisphere
 Americas
 North America
 Anglo America
 Northern America
 United States of America
 Contiguous United States
 Eastern United States
 East Coast of the United States
 Northeastern United States
 New England
 Northeast megalopolis
 Population of Massachusetts: 6,547,629  (2010 U.S. Census)
 Area of Massachusetts: 
 Atlas of Massachusetts

Places in Massachusetts 
 Historic places in Massachusetts
 National Historic Landmarks in Massachusetts
 National Register of Historic Places listings in Massachusetts
 Bridges on the National Register of Historic Places in Massachusetts
 National Natural Landmarks in Massachusetts
 National parks in Massachusetts
 State parks in Massachusetts

Environment of Massachusetts 
 Climate of Massachusetts
 Geology of Massachusetts
 Protected areas in Massachusetts
 State forests of Massachusetts
 Superfund sites in Massachusetts
 Wildlife of Massachusetts
 Fauna of Massachusetts
 Amphibians of Massachusetts
 Birds of Massachusetts
 Mammals of Massachusetts
 Reptiles of Massachusetts
 Natural Resource Protection Zoning

Natural geographic features of Massachusetts 
 Islands of Massachusetts
 Mountains of Massachusetts
 Rivers of Massachusetts

Regions of Massachusetts 

 Central Massachusetts includes Worcester County and far northwestern Middlesex County
 Blackstone Valley
 Montachusett-North County
 South County
 Eastern Massachusetts includes Barnstable, Bristol, Dukes, Essex, most of Middlesex, Nantucket, Norfolk, Plymouth and Suffolk Counties
 Central Eastern Massachusetts:
 Greater Boston
 MetroWest
 Northern Eastern Massachusetts:
 Cape Ann
 Merrimack Valley
 North Shore
Southern Eastern Massachusetts:
 Cape Cod
 The Islands
 South Shore
 Southeastern Massachusetts (a locally named region that does not encompass the entire southeastern geographical area of the state)
 South Coast
 Western Massachusetts includes Berkshire, Franklin, Hampden and Hampshire Counties
 The Berkshires
 Connecticut River Valley
 Quabbin Valley

Administrative divisions of Massachusetts 

 The 14 Counties of the Commonwealth of Massachusetts
 Barnstable County
 Berkshire County
 Bristol County
 Dukes County
 Essex County
 Franklin County
 Hampden County
 Hampshire County
 Middlesex County
 Nantucket County
 Norfolk County
 Plymouth County
 Suffolk County
 Worcester County
 Municipalities in Massachusetts
 Cities in Massachusetts
 State capital of Massachusetts: Boston
 City nicknames in Massachusetts
 Towns in Massachusetts
 Unincorporated communities in Massachusetts: There is no unincorporated territory in Massachusetts
 Census-designated places in Massachusetts

Demography of Massachusetts 

Demographics of Massachusetts

Government and politics of Massachusetts 
Politics of Massachusetts
 Form of government: U.S. state government
 United States congressional delegations from Massachusetts
 Massachusetts State Capitol
 Elections in Massachusetts
 Electoral reform in Massachusetts
 Political party strength in Massachusetts

Branches of the government of Massachusetts 

Government of Massachusetts

Executive branch of the government of Massachusetts 
 Governor of Massachusetts
 Lieutenant Governor of Massachusetts
 Secretary of State of Massachusetts
 State Treasurer of Massachusetts
 State departments
 Massachusetts Department of Transportation

Legislative branch of the government of Massachusetts 
 Massachusetts General Court (bicameral)
 Upper house: Massachusetts Senate
 Lower house: Massachusetts House of Representatives

Judicial branch of the government of Massachusetts 

Judiciary of Massachusetts
 Supreme Court of Massachusetts

Law and order in Massachusetts 
Law of Massachusetts
 Cannabis in Massachusetts
 Capital punishment in Massachusetts
 Constitution of Massachusetts
 Crime in Massachusetts
 Gun laws in Massachusetts
 Law enforcement in Massachusetts
 Law enforcement agencies in Massachusetts
 Massachusetts State Police
 Same-sex marriage in Massachusetts

Military in Massachusetts 
 Massachusetts Air National Guard
 Massachusetts Army National Guard

Local government in Massachusetts 

Local government in Massachusetts

History of Massachusetts 
History of Massachusetts

History of Massachusetts, by period 

Prehistory of Massachusetts
History of Massachusetts#Early settlement (Indigenous peoples)
English New-Plymouth Colony, November 23, 1620 – June 3, 1686
Mayflower Compact signed on November 21, 1620
English New-England Colony, September 6, 1628 – March 4, 1629
English Governour and Company of the Mattachusetts Bay in New-England, March 4, 1629 – June 3, 1686
Pequot War, July 20, 1636 – May 26, 1637
History of slavery in Massachusetts
King Philip's War, June 8, 1675 – August 12, 1676
English Dominion of New-England in America, June 3, 1686 – May 18, 1689
English Colony of New-Plymouth and Colony of Massachusetts Bay, May 18, 1689 – October 7, 1691
 English Province of Massachusetts Bay, October 7, 1691 – May 1, 1707
Queen Anne's War, 1702–1713
Raid on Deerfield, 1704
Treaty of Utrecht, 1713
British Province of Massachusetts Bay, May 1, 1707 – May 30, 1776
Dummer's War, (1722–1725)
King George's War, 1740–1748
Treaty of Aix-la-Chapelle (1748)
French and Indian War, 1754–1763
Treaty of Paris of 1763
History of Massachusetts#Revolutionary Massachusetts: 1760s–1780s (Prelude to War)
Boston Massacre, March 5, 1770
Boston Tea Party, December 16, 1773
Parliament passes the Massachusetts Government Act, May 20, 1774
Massachusetts Provincial Congress organized, October 7, 1774
American Revolutionary War, April 19, 1775 – September 3, 1783
Boston campaign, September 1, 1774 – March 17, 1776
Powder Alarm, September 1, 1774
Battles of Lexington and Concord, April 19, 1775
Siege of Boston, April 19, 1775 – March 17, 1776
Battle of Bunker Hill, June 17, 1775
United States Declaration of Independence, July 4, 1776
Treaty of Paris, September 3, 1783
History of Massachusetts#Revolutionary Massachusetts: 1760s–1780s: "State of Massachusetts Bay", July 4, 1776 – October 25, 1780
Ninth state to ratify the Articles of Confederation and Perpetual Union, signed July 9, 1778
History of Massachusetts#Federalist Era: 1780–1815: "Commonwealth of Massachusetts," since October 25, 1780
Western territorial claims ceded 1785
 Shays Rebellion of 1786-1787
Sixth state to ratify the Constitution of the United States of America, February 6, 1788
Separation of the State of Maine, 1820
American Civil War, April 12, 1861 – May 13, 1865
 Massachusetts in the American Civil War

History of Massachusetts, by region 
 by city
 History of Acton, Massachusetts
 History of Dedham, Massachusetts (disambiguation)
 History of Fall River, Massachusetts
 History of Lowell, Massachusetts
 History of Marshfield, Massachusetts
 History of Oak Bluffs, Massachusetts
 History of Springfield, Massachusetts
 History of Uxbridge, Massachusetts
 by county
 History of Berkshire County, Massachusetts
 History of Bristol County, Massachusetts
 History of Essex County, Massachusetts
 History of Middlesex County, Massachusetts
 History of Nantucket, Massachusetts
 History of Norfolk County, Massachusetts
 History of Suffolk County, Massachusetts

History of Massachusetts, by subject 
 History of education in Massachusetts
 History of the Massachusetts Institute of Technology
 History of marriage in Massachusetts
 History of slavery in Massachusetts

Culture of Massachusetts 

Culture of Massachusetts
 Cuisine of Massachusetts
 Museums in Massachusetts
 Religion in Massachusetts
 Episcopal Diocese of Massachusetts
 Episcopal Diocese of Western Massachusetts
 Roman Catholic Archdiocese of Boston
 Roman Catholic Diocese of Burlington
 Roman Catholic Diocese of Fall River
 Roman Catholic Diocese of Manchester
 Roman Catholic Diocese of Portland
 Roman Catholic Diocese of Springfield in Massachusetts
 Roman Catholic Diocese of Worcester
 Scouting in Massachusetts
 State symbols of Massachusetts
 Flag of the Commonwealth of Massachusetts
 Great Seal of the Commonwealth of Massachusetts

The arts in Massachusetts 
 Music of Massachusetts
 Theater in Massachusetts

Sports in Massachusetts 

Sports in Massachusetts
 Professional sports teams in Massachusetts

Economy and infrastructure of Massachusetts 

Economy of Massachusetts
 Communications in Massachusetts
 Newspapers in Massachusetts
 Radio stations in Massachusetts
 Television stations in Massachusetts
 Energy in Massachusetts
 Health care in Massachusetts
 Hospitals in Massachusetts
 Transportation in Massachusetts
 Airports in Massachusetts
 Rail transport in Massachusetts
 Roads in Massachusetts
 U.S. Highways in Massachusetts
 Interstate Highways in Massachusetts
 State highways in Massachusetts
 Water in Massachusetts

Education in Massachusetts 

Education in Massachusetts
 Schools in Massachusetts
 School districts in Massachusetts
 High schools in Massachusetts
 Private schools in Massachusetts
 Colleges and universities in Massachusetts
 University of Massachusetts

See also

Topic overview:
Massachusetts

Index of Massachusetts-related articles

References

External links 

Massachusetts
Massachusetts